Ketchum is a city in Blaine County, Idaho, located in the central part of the state. The population was 3,555 at the 2020 census, up from 2,689 in 2010. Located in the Wood River Valley, Ketchum is adjacent to Sun Valley and the communities share many resources: both sit in the same valley beneath Bald Mountain, with its world-famous skiing. The city also draws tourists from around the world to enjoy its fishing, hiking, trail riding, tennis, shopping, art galleries, and more.

History
Originally the smelting center of the Warm Springs mining district, the town was first named Leadville in 1880. The postal department decided that was too common and renamed it for David Ketchum, a local trapper and guide who had staked a claim in the basin a year earlier. Smelters were built in the 1880s, with the Philadelphia Smelter, located on Warm Springs Road, processing large amounts of lead and silver for about a decade.

After the mining boom subsided in the 1890s, sheepmen from the south drove their flocks north through Ketchum in the summer, to graze in the upper elevation areas of the Pioneer, Boulder, and Sawtooth mountains. By 1920, Ketchum had become the largest sheep-shipping center in the West. In the fall, massive flocks of sheep flowed south into the town's livestock corrals at the Union Pacific Railroad's railhead, which connected to the main line at Shoshone.

After the development of Sun Valley by the Union Pacific Railroad in 1936, Ketchum became popular with celebrities, including Gary Cooper and Ernest Hemingway. Hemingway loved the surrounding area; he fished, hunted, and in the late 1950s bought a home overlooking the Wood River in nearby Warm Springs. It was there he committed suicide; he and his granddaughter, model and actress Margaux Hemingway, are buried in the Ketchum Cemetery. The local elementary school is named in his honor.

Every Labor Day weekend, Ketchum hosts the Wagon Days festival, a themed carnival featuring Old West wagon trains, narrow ore wagons, and a parade.

The Clint Eastwood film Pale Rider (1985) was partially filmed in the Boulder Mountains near Ketchum.

Ketchum is referenced in the song "Ketchum, ID" by indie rock band boygenius.

Geography

However, two mountain streams, Trail Creek and Warm Springs Creek, join the Big Wood River in Ketchum.

Climate

According to the Köppen Climate Classification system, Ketchum has a warm-summer mediterranean continental climate, abbreviated "Dsb" on climate maps.

Demographics

Ketchum is home to several faith communities, including the Presbyterian Church of the Bigwood, St. Thomas Episcopal Church, Our Lady of the Snows Catholic Church, and the Wood River Jewish Community.

2010 census
At the 2010 census there were 2,689 people, 1,431 households, and 583 families living in the city. The racial makeup of the city was 90.9% White, 0.1% African American, 0.1% Native American, 1.3% Asian, 6.5% from other races, and 1.0% from two or more races. Hispanic or Latino of any race were 9.1%.

Of the 1,431 households 15.7% had children under the age of 18 living with them, 33.2% were married couples living together, 5.0% had a female householder with no husband present, 2.6% had a male householder with no wife present, and 59.3% were non-families. 44.1% of households were one person and 11.5% were one person aged 65 or older. The average household size was 1.88 and the average family size was 2.63.

The median age was 44 years. 14.3% of residents were under the age of 18; 5.8% were between the ages of 18 and 24; 31.4% were from 25 to 44; 32.3% were from 45 to 64; and 16.3% were 65 or older. The gender makeup of the city was 52.0% male and 48.0% female.

2000 census
At the 2000 census there were 3,003 people, 1,582 households, and 607 families living in the city. The racial makeup of the city was 94.74% White, 0.27% Native American, 0.57% Asian, 0.17% Pacific Islander, 2.33% from other races, and 1.93% from two or more races. Hispanic or Latino of any race were 4.90%.

Of the 1,582 households 14.2% had children under the age of 18 living with them, 30.1% were married couples living together, 5.6% had a female householder with no husband present, and 61.6% were non-families. 42.2% of households were one person and 6.8% were one person aged 65 or older. The average household size was 1.90 and the average family size was 2.60.

The age distribution was 12.5% under the age of 18, 9.4% from 18 to 24, 37.6% from 25 to 44, 31.1% from 45 to 64, and 9.4% 65 or older. The median age was 39 years. For every 100 females, there were 116.2 males. For every 100 females age 18 and over, there were 117.1 males.

The median household income was $45,457 and the median family income was $73,750. Males had a median income of $31,712 versus $27,857 for females. The per capita income for the city was $41,798. About 3.5% of families and 8.9% of the population were below the poverty line, including 10.9% of those under age 18 and 6.6% of those age 65 or over.

Notable people 
 Melissa Arnot - mountain guide
 Bowe Bergdahl, United States Army soldier captured by the Taliban
 Alan Blinken, businessman, political candidate, and former United States Ambassador to Belgium
 Peter Cetera, musician and original member of Chicago
 Christin Cooper - alpine ski racer
 Dick Dorworth, ski racer and coach
 Carl B. Feldbaum, author, businessman, and lawyer
 Richard Feldman, cyclist
 Dick Fosbury, retired high jumper
 Karl Fostvedt, freeskier
 Gretchen Fraser - alpine ski racer, first US winter Olympic Gold medalist
 Eb Gaines, businessman and diplomat
 Scott Glenn, actor
 Frank R. Gooding, politician; 7th governor of Idaho
 Ernest Hemingway - Nobel Prize-winning author and outdoorsman
 Mariel Hemingway - Academy Award-nominated actress, granddaughter of Ernest Hemingway
 Wendy Jaquet, former member of the Idaho House of Representatives
 Rod Kagan, artist
 Cody Lampl, professional hockey player
 Maia Makhateli, ballet dancer
 Steve Miller - rock musician ("Steve Miller Band")
 Carson Palmer - Heisman Trophy Winner & Former NFL football player with Cincinnati, Oakland, and Arizona
 William N. Panzer, television and film producer
 Denne Bart Petitclerc, journalist and television producer
 Tim Ryan - sportscaster
 Melvin Schwartz, Nobel Prize-winning physicist
 Jim Sinegal - partial year; founder and former CEO of Costco Wholesale
 Ann Sothern, actress
 Clint Stennett, former member of the Idaho Legislature
 Michelle Stennett, member and Minority Leader of the Idaho Senate
 Picabo Street - Olympic and world champion ski racer
 Ed Viesturs - only American to climb all 14 eight thousand meter peaks 
 Adam West - actor, TV's Batman
 Van Williams - actor
 Steve Wynn - partial year; founder and former CEO of Wynn Resorts

Points of interest 
 Sawtooth Botanical Garden
 Ketchum Sun Valley Historical Society Heritage & Ski Museum
 Sawtooth National Recreation Area
 Sun Valley's Bald Mountain or "Baldy" has 13 chairlifts and 65 runs.

Special events 

 Trailing of the Sheep
 Ride Sun Valley Bike Festival
 Sun Valley Jazz Festival
 Sun Valley Summer Symphony
 Wagon Days
 Sun Valley Film Festival
 TEDxSunValley

Sister cities 

  Lignano Sabbiadoro, Italy
  Tegernsee, Germany

References

External links

 City website
 Sun Valley/Ketchum Chamber & Visitors Bureau
 Ketchum Sun Valley Historical Society Heritage & Ski Museum

Cities in Blaine County, Idaho
Cities in Idaho